Harri Harras Hursti (born 10 July 1968 in Helsinki, Finland) is a Finnish computer programmer and former chairman of the board and co-founder of ROMmon, where he supervised in the development of the world's smallest 2-gigabit traffic analysis product that was later acquired by F-Secure Corporation.

Hursti is well known for participating in the Black Box Voting hack studies, along with Dr. Herbert "Hugh" Thompson. The memory card hack demonstrated in Leon County is popularly known as "the Hursti Hack". This hack was part of a series of four voting machine hacking tests organized by the nonprofit election watchdog group Black Box Voting in collaboration with the producers of HBO documentary Hacking Democracy (2006). The studies demonstrated serious security flaws in the voting systems of Diebold Election Systems. Hursti also appeared in the HBO documentary Kill Chain: The Cyber War on America's Elections (2020).

Hursti has lived in the United States since 2009.

Awards
Hursti received the EFF Pioneer Award in October 2009 with Limor "Ladyada" Fried and Carl Malamud.

References

External links
 Hacking Democracy: Official Website and DVD
 "Hacking Democracy" HBO Documentary Films
 "Hacking Democracy" (Internet Movie Database)
 Kill Chain: The Cyber War on America's Elections

Living people
Finnish computer programmers
1968 births
Finnish expatriates in the United States